Oliver Theophilus Jones,  (born September 11, 1934 in Little Burgundy, Montreal, Quebec) is a Canadian jazz pianist, organist, composer and arranger.

Musical career 
Born to Barbadian parents, Oliver Jones began his career as a pianist at the age of five, studying with Mme Bonner in Little Burgundy's Union United Church, made famous by Trevor W. Payne's Montreal Jubilation Gospel Choir.  He continued to develop his talent through his studies with Oscar Peterson's sister, Daisy Peterson Sweeney, starting at eight years old. In addition to performing at Union United Church when he was a child, he also performed a solo novelty act at the Cafe St. Michel as well as other clubs and theaters in the Montreal area. "I had a trick piano act, dancing, doing the splits, playing from underneath the piano, or with a sheet over the keys."

He started his early touring in Vermont and Quebec with a band called Bandwagon, and in 1953–63 played mainly in the Montreal area, with tours in Quebec.

From 1964 to 1980, Jones was music director for the Jamaican calypso singer Kenny Hamilton, based out of Puerto Rico.

In late 1980, he teamed up with Montreal's Charlie Biddle, working in and around local clubs and hotel lounges in Montreal. Jones was resident pianist at Charlie Biddle's jazz club 'Biddles' from 1981 to 1986.  His first album, Live at Biddles recorded in 1983, was the first record on the Justin Time record label.

By the mid-1980s, he was travelling throughout Canada, appearing at festivals, concerts and clubs, either as a solo artist or with a trio: Skip Bey, Bernard Primeau, and Archie Alleyne. His travels also took him to Europe during this period.

His tour of Nigeria was the subject of a 1990 National Film Board of Canada documentary, Oliver Jones in Africa. His music also appears in the NFB animated short film, Black Soul. In 1998, Jones wrote, arranged and performed the original score to the documentary film, Season of Change (Rightime Productions) about Jackie Robinson's season with the Montreal Royals baseball club in 1946. In 2011 he was one of the big names on the line up of the P.E.I. Jazz and Blues Festival at Charlottetown. Jones was headliner for the Jazz Sudbury Festival 2013, held from Sept. 6-8, 2013.

Educator 
Jones taught music at Laurentian University in 1987, and in 1988 he taught music at McGill University in Montreal.

In 2009, Jones mentored jazz artist Dione Taylor through the Governor General's Performing Arts Awards (GGPAA) Mentorship Program. The program pairs a mid-career artist with a past GGPAA recipient.  The two artists work together to learn and grow from each other's experiences.

Awards and nominations 
Officer of the Order of Canada.  (1993)

In 1994, Jones was bestowed the National Order of Québec, with the rank of Chevalier (Knight).

Jones received the Governor General's Performing Arts Award in 2005, Canada's highest honour in the performing arts.

In 1986, Jones won a Juno Award for his album titled Lights of Burgundy, and again in 2009 for Second Time around.  He has been nominated nine other times, the most recent being in 2012, with his album Live in Baden.

He was given the Félix Award, in 1989, 1994, 2007 and 2008.

Jones was voted keyboardist of the year, from the National Jazz Awards in 2006.

The Oscar Peterson Award (1990)

In 1999, Jones was awarded the Special Achievement Award at the SOCAN Awards in Toronto.

Discography

References

External links
The Canadian Encyclopedia
All About Jazz: review, Just in Time
All About Jazz: review, Just You, Just Me with Ranee Lee
Portrait of a musical life August 26, 2006 - Montreal Gazette

1934 births
Living people
People from Le Sud-Ouest
Canadian jazz pianists
Musicians from Montreal
Canadian people of Barbadian descent
Black Canadian musicians
Academic staff of Laurentian University
Academic staff of McGill University
Anglophone Quebec people
Juno Award for Best Jazz Album winners
Officers of the Order of Canada
Knights of the National Order of Quebec
Governor General's Performing Arts Award winners
Juno Award for Traditional Jazz Album of the Year winners
21st-century Canadian pianists
Justin Time Records artists